Power Tool may refer to:

 an early contractual name of Nelson (band)
 Power tool